The China Baseball League (CBL) was a professional baseball league under the administration of Chinese Baseball Association, founded in 2002. The league suspended operations in 2012 due to financial troubles after the 2011 season, but returned in 2014. The league closed permanently in 2016. The 2018 season was the final edition of China Baseball League after the establishment of the China National Baseball League.

Stadiums had standard dimensions of 98m, 122m, 98m. Teams also participated in five-game tournaments throughout the year such as the National Baseball Championships, the National Youth Baseball Championships and the Cross-Straits Baseball Tournament.

Clubs

Division 1

Division 2 

The original four teams were the Beijing Tigers, Tianjin Lions, Shanghai Eagles and Guangzhou Lightning. The Hope Stars and Dragons joined them in 2005. The Hope Stars were an under-21 team of promising players from around the country. Henan Elephants entered CBL as an expansion team in 2009.

Earlier seasons 
The first season ran from April 26 to May 25, 2002 with a one-game championship.

In the 2004 season, the defending champion Beijing Tigers once again defeated the Tianjin Lions in the best-of-five finals.  They came back from an 0-2 deficit to win the series 3 games to 2.

The opening day of the 2005 season was April 1, 2005.  The regular season ended on June 26. In the 2005 best-of-five championship series, the Beijing Tigers swept the Tianjin Lions, three games to none, giving the Tigers their third straight title. (The 2005 championship series was abbreviated to three games due to SARS.)

In 2014 the CBL returned with a six-game regular season with four teams - the Tigers and Pegasus in the North Division and the Leopards and Lions in the South Division. In the finals the Tigers defeated the Lions in the best-of-three finals two games to one. hotStar United began sponsoring the CBL in 2014.

The 2015 regular season featured six teams from Division 1 playing 15 games each. Division 2 teams played six games each. The Jiangsu Pegasus swept the Beijing Tigers two games to none to win their first-ever championship.

Chinese Baseball League winners

Partnership with Nippon Professional Baseball 
In 2007, the CBL began a support relationship with Nippon Professional Baseball, Japan's baseball league. The agreement allows the Japanese clubs to send coaches and players to China and Chinese players to train at the Japanese facilities.

All teams will have a Japanese team as a partner. Beijing will pair with the Yomiuri Giants, Sichuan with the Fukuoka SoftBank Hawks, Shanghai with the Hanshin Tigers, Jiangsu with the Chiba Lotte Marines and Guangdong with the Hiroshima Toyo Carp. Tianjin will continue its existing relationship with the Yokohama BayStars which began in 2005.

See also 
 Baseball awards
 China Stars
 Chinese Baseball Association
 MLB China Series

References

External links 
 Official Weibo
 hotStar United Official Website
 National baseball league newcomers
 Shanghai Diaries: In Search of Baseball's Yao Ming (November 30, 2004)
 First season 2002
 2004 championship
 China's Slow Emergence into Baseball, Part I (February 28, 2008)
 Fastball to Nowhere (December 19, 2008)
 China Baseball League roster mod for Baseball Mogul

 
Baseball leagues in Asia
Baseball in China
2002 establishments in China
Sports leagues established in 2002
Annual sporting events in China
Sports leagues disestablished in 2018
Professional sports leagues in China
Defunct baseball leagues